802 Naval Air Squadron (802 NAS) was a Naval Air Squadron of the Royal Navy's Fleet Air Arm.

Early history
802 Squadron was formed on 3 April 1933 aboard  by the merger of two independent Royal Air Force naval units, 408 (Fleet Fighter) Flight and 409 (Fleet Fighter) Flight.

Aircraft
 Nimrod I S1579 571
 Osprey I K2783 
 Osprey III K3643 549
 Osprey III Seaplane K3644 590

Second World War
In April 1940 802 Squadron was serving aboard Glorious  with twelve Gloster Sea Gladiators when the ship was recalled to participate in the defence of Norway. The squadron ceased to exist after Glorious was sunk by the German battleships Scharnhorst and Gneisenau on 8 June 1940 during the defence of Norway.

In the following month the whole squadron was involved in Gibraltar escort convoys from Audacity from which it shot down four Focke-Wulf Fw 200's.

In September, the squadron embarked on Avenger and provided fighter cover on the Algerian invasion beaches.

The squadron lay dormant till May 1945 when reformed at Arbroath with 24 Supermarine Seafire L.IIIs.

Post-war service
Squadron pilot Lieutenant "Hoagy" Carmichael shot down a Mikoyan-Gurevich MiG-15 on 9 August 1952. Carmichael achieved this feat during a dogfight which started when a formation of four Sea Furys under his command were attacked by eight MiGs during a fighter bomber mission over Chinnampo.

Plans to reform 802 Squadron at Yeovilton in 1979 with five British Aerospace Sea Harriers failed to materialise.

References

Citations

Bibliography

800 series Fleet Air Arm squadrons
Military units and formations established in 1933